The Vietnam national futsal team represents Vietnam in international futsal and is governed by Vietnam Football Federation.

History

Beginning
In 1950, the South Vietnam futsal team was established, the predecessor of the current Vietnam national futsal team, but could not go abroad to play due to political problems.

In 1997, the first national team's squad was set up. In that time, all Vietnamese futsal players came from football such as: Nguyễn Hữu Thắng, Nguyễn Hồng Sơn, Lại Công Minh, Trần Minh Chiến. The team joined 1997 Tiger's Cup/World 5's Futsal in Singapore. In this tournament, they were drawn in the same group with Italy, Iran and the host Singapore. They finished third in their group after getting one win against the host team and two losses against Italy and Iran. After this tournament, the team was disbanded for many years.

2005–2008: Decline
After being inactive for eight years, the national team was reformed and joined 2005 AFF Futsal Championship and 2005 AFC Futsal Championship, of which Vietnam was host. The team finished 5/6 teams in AFF Futsal Championship 2005 and the bottom of 2005 AFC Championship. Vietnam failed to qualify for the AFC Championship in 2006 and 2007. The team also failed to reach the far from group-stage of the AFF tournament.

2009–2013: Regeneration
After these results in international competitions, the team decided to hire foreign futsal head coach. In 2008, Pattaya Piamkum was the first foreign futsal head coach. Vietnam reached to the final of 2009 AFF Futsal Championship which Vietnam was host, the team's first ever in AFF Futsal Championship.

In 2010, Pattaya resigned and was replaced by an Italian head coach, Sergio Gargelli. The team qualified for 2010 AFC Futsal Championship, their second continental tournament since 2005. In region AFF tournaments, the team earned two silver medals in 2011 Southeast Asian Games and 2013 Southeast Asian Games, finish second in 2012 AFF Futsal Championship.

2014–2016: Success in AFC tournaments and first FIFA Futsal World Cup

In 2014, Gargelli stepped down as coach. Bruno García Formoso became the new coach of the team. Vietnam qualified for 2014 AFC Futsal Championship, the third AFC competition, as host. In this tournament, Vietnam reached the quarter-final for the first time.

Vietnam also qualified for 2016 AFC Futsal Championship. The team got a shocking win over Japan in the quarter-final and reached the semi-final for the first time. This result also qualified Vietnam for 2016 FIFA Futsal World Cup in Colombia, their first FIFA tournament. The team also reached the knock-out stage after beating Guatemala 4–2, losing to Paraguay 1–7 and Italy 0–2. In the round of 16, they lost to Russia 0–7. The team also got FIFA Fair-play award from this tournament, first FIFA award of Vietnam Football.

2017–2020: the new stage
After 2016's success, García stepped down as coach. In 2017, Miguel Rodrigo became the new coach.

Vietnam played exhibition games in Andalusia against Spanish clubs during late February to early March 2019.

2021 World Cup: Second World Cup
The team qualified for the 2021 FIFA Futsal World Cup after holding a draw with Lebanon in two-legged matches Asian play-off with a total score of 1–1 (Vietnam qualified because of the away goal rule).

In the World Cup, Vietnam was drawn in group D along with Brazil, Czech Republic and Panama. After being thrashed by Brazil 1–9 in the opening match, Vietnam secured a needed victory against Panama with the total score of 3–2 and drew the Czech Republic 1–1, putting them in the top 4 third-placed teams and qualifying them for the round of 16 for the second time in a row. There, they met Russia, the team that they had lost against 0-7 five years ago. Vietnam narrowly lost to Russia 2–3 and end their campaign in the round of 16 in high spirits.

Results and fixtures

The following is a list of match results in the last 12 months, as well as any future matches that have been scheduled.
Legend

2021

2022

Coaching staff

Current coaching staff

Manager history

Team

Current squad
The following 16 players are called for 2021 FIFA Futsal World Cup in Lithuania.

Recent call-ups
The following players have also been called up to the Vietnam squad within the last 12 months.

Notes:
[a] Withdrew from squad.
SUS Player suspended.
INJ Player withdrew from the squad due to an injury.
RET Retired from the national team.
WD Player withdrew from the squad for non-injury related reasons.
PRE Preliminary squad.

Previous squads

FIFA Futsal World Cup
2016 FIFA Futsal World Cup squads
2021 FIFA Fustal World Cup squads

AFC Futsal Championship

2018 AFC Futsal Championship squads

AFF Futsal Championship

Competitive record

Summary

FIFA Futsal World Cup

Futsal Confederations Cup

AFC Futsal Asian Cup

AFF Futsal Championship

Asian Indoor and Martial Arts Games

Southeast Asian Games

Grand Prix de Futsal

Friendly tournaments

*Denotes draws include knockout matches decided on penalty kicks.
**Gold background color indicates that the tournament was won.

FIFA world rankings
Rankings are calculated by FIFA.

Head-to-head record
The record of Vietnam against other countries since the first official international match against Italy on 4 December 1997.  Only official games were regarded.

See also

Vietnam national under-20 futsal team
Vietnam women's national futsal team
Vietnamese National Futsal Cup
Vietnam Futsal League

References

External links

FIFA profile
Thai Son Nam FC official website
Official fanpage on Facebook
Futsal News on Twitter (English version)
VFF on YouTube
Ho Chi Minh City FF
Ho Chi Minh City FF on YouTube
Futsal Network in Vietnam
Futsal Focus

Asian national futsal teams
Futsal
National